The 14th Filipino Academy of Movie Arts and Sciences Awards Night was held 1n 1966 for the Outstanding Achievements for the year 1965. 

Ang Daigdig Ng Mga Api was the first film ever to win all the major awards in FAMAS history including the FAMAS Award for Best Picture, Best Director, Best Actor, Best Actress and Best Screenplay. It was also the first film to ever win four (out of six) acting awards from the FAMAS: Best Actor (Robert Arevalo), Best Actress (Barbara Perez), Best Supporting Actress (Leni Alano) and Best Child Actress (Ana Trinidad).  This was also the first time a husband and a wife won the two top acting awards.

Awards

Major Awards
Winners are listed first and highlighted with boldface.

References

External links
FAMAS Awards 

FAMAS Award
FAMAS
FAMAS